Beerakuppam is a small village in Nagalapuram Mandal in Tirupati district in the state of Andhra Pradesh in India. Beerakuppam is in Satyavedu Assembly Constituency.

References 

–

Villages in Tirupati district